Evilásio is a Portuguese masculine given name, mainly found in Brazil.

People
 :pt:Evilásio Neri Caon (1929), Brazilian lawyer and journalist
 :pt:Evilásio Tenorio (1950), bishop of Recife, Brazil 
 :pt:Evilásio Cavalcante Farias (1952), Brazilian politician
 Evilásio Leite da Costa, Brazilian footballer
 Duas Caras Brazilian TV soap character Evilásio Caó

References

Portuguese masculine given names